Karen Davis is a former mayor of Glendora, California. She is a registered Democrat.

Davis was elected to the Glendora City Council in 2005, re-elected in 2009, and has served as the city's mayor since 2008. Karen graduated from the University of the Pacific in Stockton, California, where she earned a Bachelor's degree in Communication Arts and pursued a career in sport journalism after graduation. Davis has been a Pastor at First Christian Church in Glendora since 1993, has obtained Senior Chaplain Certification from the International Conference of Police Chaplains and is currently a Chaplain for the Glendora Police Department. Davis also serves as the President of the Glendora Ministerial Association as well as various other committees throughout the community.

Davis will be elected to another term unopposed in March 2013.

Davis's husband is Pastor of Central Christian Church in Glendale, and they have two daughters. Davis also runs on the weekends, most notably the Pride Of The Valley 5K in Baldwin Park, California.

References

External links
Official homepage
Official Glendora website profile

Living people
Mayors of Glendora, California
Women mayors of places in California
California Democrats
American Congregationalist ministers
Year of birth missing (living people)
21st-century American women